The Falconar SAL Mustang, also called the 2/3 Mustang and the SAL P-51D Mustang is a Canadian amateur-built aircraft, originally produced by Falconar Avia and introduced in 1969. The aircraft is a  scale replica of the North American P-51 Mustang and is supplied as a kit or as plans for amateur construction.

Since the winding up of business by Falconar Avia in 2019, the plans are now sold by Manna Aviation.

Design and development
In 1963 Falconar partnered with designer Marcel Jurca to produce the Jurca Gnatsum. By 1967, Falconar recommended a large number of changes to the design, which resulted in Jurca leaving the project. The modified aircraft was developed as the SAL Mustang and first flown in 1971 after significant cost overruns. Falconar Aircraft Ltd was sold to George F. Chivers and other investors, and operated as Sturgeon Air Ltd (SAL) with Falconar as an employee until 1973.

The SAL Mustang features a cantilever low-wing, a single-seat, or optionally a two-seats-in-tandem, enclosed cockpit under a bubble canopy, retractable conventional landing gear, including a manually retractable tailwheel and a single engine in tractor configuration.

The aircraft is made from wood covered with fibreglass cloth and doped aircraft fabric. Some parts, like the belly air scoop are made from fibreglass. Engines that have been used include the  Lycoming IO-360 horizontally opposed engine, the  Ranger L-440 inverted inline, the  Avia M 337 inverted inline,  Continental O-470 horizontally opposed, the  Ford  V6 automotive conversion, as well as other automotive V-6 or V-8 powerplants. Construction time from the supplied kit is estimated as 2500 hours.

An alternative set of plans allows constructing a tandem two-seat version. The plans are very detailed and complete and one builder rated them as "the best I have seen on any homebuilt airplane".

Operational history
The prototype was introduced at the 1971 EAA airshow painted in the same gold and red colors as the Canadian Golden Hawks airshow team.

In July 2012 the manufacturer indicated that 18 examples had been completed and flown in the 43 years that the plans and kits had been available.

Specifications (SAL Mustang)

References

External links
Official website
Photo of a Falconar SAL Mustang

Homebuilt aircraft
SAL Mustang
Single-engined tractor aircraft